United Nations Security Council Resolution 288, adopted unanimously on November 17, 1970, after reaffirming previous resolutions on the topic, the Council called upon the United Kingdom, as the legal administering Power of Southern Rhodesia, to bring an end to the illegal rebellion.  The Council decided that the present sanctions against Rhodesia would remain in place and urged all states to implement all pertinent resolutions and not to grant any form of recognition to the regime.

See also
 List of United Nations Security Council Resolutions 201 to 300 (1965–1971)

References
Text of the Resolution at undocs.org

External links
 

 0288
 0288
 0288
United Nations Security Council sanctions regimes
November 1970 events